Rajshree Pathy (born 15 April 1956) is an Indian entrepreneur from Coimbatore, Tamil Nadu. She is the chairperson and managing director of the Rajshree Group of Companies and founder of India Design Forum. The Rajshree Group has varied business interests, including food and agriculture, energy, travel, health, hospitality and the arts. Pathy also promotes performing arts and contemporary art movement in Coimbatore through the Contemplate Art Gallery and COCCA.

Early life
Rajshree Pathy is the daughter of famous industrialist G. Varadaraj, of the PSG family, who are Telugus. She is married to S. Pathy, chairman and managing director of Lakshmi Mills.

Professional career
Rajshree Sugars and Chemicals Ltd. is a company with interests across integrated fields such as sugar, distillery, power generation and biotechnology. It was founded by her father G. Varadaraj. Rajshree range of products includes white sugar, alcohol, organic manure, bio-products and power.

Awards and recognition
Global Leaders of Tomorrow (1996), World Economic Forum
Eisenhower Exchange Fellowship (2000)
Padma Shri (2013), Government of India

External links 

 Rajshree Sugars Rajshree Sugars and Chemicals Ltd Website.

References

Businesspeople from Tamil Nadu
People from Coimbatore
Living people
Businesswomen from Tamil Nadu
Recipients of the Padma Shri in trade and industry
Indian chairpersons of corporations
20th-century Indian businesswomen
20th-century Indian businesspeople
21st-century Indian businesswomen
21st-century Indian businesspeople
1956 births